The Division of Robertson is an Australian electoral division in the state of New South Wales.

Geography

Federal electoral division boundaries in Australia have been determined since 1984, at redistributions by a redistribution committee appointed by the Australian Electoral Commission. Redistributions occur for the boundaries of divisions in a particular state, and they occur every seven years, or sooner if a state's representation entitlement changes or when divisions of a state are malapportioned.

History

The division was proclaimed at Federation in 1900, and was one of the original 65 divisions to be contested at the first federal election in 1901. The division was named for the fifth Premier of New South Wales, Sir John Robertson.

The Division of Robertson was originally anchored in rural central NSW, encompassing the area around Dubbo, Mudgee and Wellington. 

It moved eastward to take in Gosford in 1913, and since then it has been moved further eastward in successive redistributions.  By 1969, it had moved to approximately its current position on the Central Coast, immediately north of the Hawkesbury River, and now includes none of its original territory. Nonetheless, it has retained the name of Robertson, in part because the Australian Electoral Commission is required to preserve the names of original electorates where possible.

Robertson encompasses the towns of Woy Woy, Gosford and Terrigal.

Two of its members have served as Senators prior or subsequent to their tenures on Robertson. Former Senator Belinda Neal was elected in Robertson in 2007 and Deborah O'Neill became a Senator shortly after losing Robertson in 2013.

In recent years, Robertson has been a bellwether electorate in federal elections, taking on a character similar to mortgage belt seats on Sydney's outer fringe. It has been held by a member of the party of government since the 1983 federal election. In addition, after Mike Kelly became the first opposition MP elected to represent Eden-Monaro (in 2016) since 1975, Robertson currently holds the record for the longest-running bellwether seat in Australia.

The current Member for Robertson, since the 2022 federal election, is Gordon Reid, a member of the Australian Labor Party.

The new bellwether
Ahead of the 2016 election, ABC psephologist Antony Green listed Robertson in his election guide as one of eleven which he classed as "bellwether" electorates. Prior to the 2016 election, the seat of Eden-Monaro was long regarded as Australia's most famous bellwether. From the 1972 election until the 2013 election – over 40 years – Eden-Monaro was won by the party that also won government. No longer the nation's famous bellwether seat after the Labor opposition won it at the 2016 election, the nation's new longest-running bellwether is Robertson – continually won by the party that won government since the 1983 election. This trend in Robertson would continue in the 2022 election, with Labor winning the seat and Government.

Members

Election results

Graphical summary

References

External links
 Division of Robertson - Australian Electoral Commission

Electoral divisions of Australia
Constituencies established in 1901
1901 establishments in Australia
Central Coast (New South Wales)